Transcription factor RFX3 is a protein that in humans is encoded by the RFX3 gene.

This gene is a member of the regulatory factor X gene family, which encodes transcription factors that contain a highly-conserved winged helix DNA binding domain. The protein encoded by this gene is structurally related to regulatory factors X1, X2, X4, and X5. It is a transcriptional activator that can bind DNA as a monomer or as a heterodimer with other RFX family members. Two transcript variants encoding different isoforms have been described for this gene, and at least one of the variants utilizes alternative polyadenylation signals.

References

Further reading

Transcription factors